Joseph Knight may refer to:

 Joseph Knight (cricketer) (1896–1974), English cricketer
 Joseph Knight (critic) (1829–1907), English dramatic critic and theatre historian
 Joseph Knight (horticulturist) (1778–1855), gardener
 Joseph Knight (slave), slave brought from Jamaica to Scotland
 Joseph Knight (novel), a 2003 historical novel by James Robertson
 Joseph Knight (Royal Navy officer) (c. 1708–1775)
 Joseph Knight Sr. (1772–1847), associate of Joseph Smith, early member of the Latter Day Saint movement
 Joseph Philip Knight (1812–1887), British composer
 Joe Knight (baseball) (1859–1938), Major League Baseball left fielder and pitcher 
 Joe Knight (boxer) (1909–1976), American boxer
 For the plane crash victim and subject of an internet hoax, see Alaska Airlines Flight 261